Patience Lake is a lake in central Saskatchewan, Canada east of Saskatoon.  The lake is located in the rural municipality of Blucher No. 343.  The lake serves as a groundwater discharge region for higher elevations to the east and west.

At the south end of the lake, the Potash Corporation of Saskatchewan operates a solution mine that produces 331,000 tonne of potash annually and has an approximately 50 ha region of the lake sectioned off with an earth dyke that is used to store brine tailings and saturated KCl solution.  The potash mine was originally established as an underground mine, but due to flooding in 1988 it was converted to a solution mine.

See also
List of lakes of Saskatchewan

References

Lakes of Saskatchewan
Blucher No. 343, Saskatchewan